Alaska is a state of the United States of America.

Alaska may also refer to:

Geography

Populated places

United States
 Alaska, Indiana, in Owen County
 Alaska, a former unincorporated community in Caledonia Township, Kent County, Michigan
 Alaska, New Mexico, in Cibola County
 Alaska, Jefferson County, Pennsylvania
 Alaska, Northumberland County, Pennsylvania
 Alaska, West Virginia
 Alaska, Wisconsin, in the town of Pierce, Kewaunee County
 Alaska Township, Beltrami County, Minnesota

Zimbabwe
 Alaska, Zimbabwe, in the province of Mashonaland West

Other places
 19148 Alaska, an asteroid
 Alaska Basin, a subarctic basin in Wyoming, US
 Alaska Current (Pacific Ocean), a warm-water eddy current
 Alaska Highway (Canada and US)
 Alaska Peninsula (US)
 Alaska Range (Canada, US), a mountain range
 Alaska Territory (US), historical name for Alaska before statehood, from 1912 to 1959
 Alaska Time Zone, a geographic region that keeps time by subtracting nine hours from Coordinated Universal Time
 Russian America (former-Russian Empire), historical name for present-day Alaska

People with the name
 Alaska (singer) (born 1963), a Mexican-Spanish singer
 Alaska P. Davidson (1868-1934), an American law enforcement officer
 Alaska Taufa (born 1983), a Tongan rugby union player
 Alaska Thunderfuck 5000 (born 1985), an American drag performer and recording artist
 David Bullock (entrepreneur) (born 1993), nicknamed "Alaska", an American entrepreneur

Arts, entertainment, and media

Films
 Alaska (1944 film), an American film directed by George Archainbaud
 Alaska (1996 film), an American film directed by Fraser Clarke Heston
 Alaska (2015 film), an Italian film directed by Claudio Cupellini
 Alaska: Spirit of the Wild, a 1997 American documentary film directed by George Casey

Literature
 Alaska (novel), a 1988 novel by James A. Michener
 Alaska (pamphlet), an 1875 pamphlet by Jón Ólafsson proposing an Icelandic colony in Alaska
 Alaska, the first play by British playwright D. C. Moore, produced in 2007

Music

Groups and labels
 Alaska (band), a British hard rock band
 Alaska!, an American indie rock band

Albums
 Alaska (Between the Buried and Me album), 2005
 Alaska (The Silver Seas album), 2013

Songs
 "Alaska" (song), by Maggie Rogers, 2016
 "Alaska", a song by Brockhampton from the album Saturation III, 2017
 "Alaska", a song by Cactus from the album Restrictions, 1971
 "Alaska", a song by Pendragon from the album The Jewel , 1985
 "Alaska", a song by Phish from the album Party Time, 2009
 "Alaska", a song by Shadow Gallery from the album Carved in Stone, 1995
 "Alaska", an instrumental by U.K. from the album U.K., 1978

Television
 "Alaska" (Fear the Walking Dead), a 2020 episode of Fear the Walking Dead
 Jay Hammond's Alaska, a 1980s television series hosted by the former Alaska governor
 Przystanek Alaska (Alaska Station), the Polish name for the television series Northern Exposure
 Sarah Palin's Alaska, a 2010s television series, also hosted by a former Alaska governor

Other arts, entertainment, and media
 Alaska (magazine), a monthly magazine published in and about the state
 Alaska Young, a character in the book Looking for Alaska by John Green

Ships
 Alaska-class cruiser
 , British passenger ship
 USS Alaska, a name shared by several ships of the US Navy

Other uses
 Alaska Airlines, a major American air carrier founded in Alaska and headquartered near Seattle, Washington
 Alaska Milk Corporation, manufacturer of milk products in the Philippines
 Alaska Aces (PBA), a professional basketball team owned by the Alaska Milk Corporation
 Baked Alaska, a dessert

See also
 AK (disambiguation)
 Alaskan (disambiguation)